Jane Bauman is an American painter, sculptor, and academic. She has been a professor and Chair of the Visual and Performing Art Department at Coastline Community College in Newport Beach, California. As a working artist, she is very active in the Southern California art scene.

Early life and education
Bauman was born in Burbank, California and grew up in Los Angeles where surf culture, the 60’s hippie movement, psychedelic music and the Hollywood movie industry had a formative influence on her artistic development.

Career
Bauman received her Bachelor’s degree from Santa Clara University in 1973. She then enrolled at San Francisco Art Institute and earned her Master of Fine Arts degree in 1980. Shortly after graduating from SFAI, she moved to New York City and became very active in the East Village art scene. She also took interest in the punk/no wave culture of the late 1970s and began to do her first street art as well as making paintings and sculptures. She created the cover for the Tellus Audio Cassette Magazine issue #10 All Guitars!.

In 1988, Bauman left New York and moved back to California where she became a full professor and Chair of the Visual and Performing Art Department at Coastline College in Newport Beach. From 2003 through 2013, she taught six Study Abroad Programs in Florence, Italy which had a big impact on her art.

Works
Bauman’s artworks are based on decay, quick application, and associations with outlaw graffiti and subcultures. In her paintings, she uses commercial spray paints for their bright colors. The distinguishing characteristic of her work is the sharp-edge of her stenciled images. She collaborated on several art projects with Mark C. (of Live Skull). Their first collaboration was a series of painted records and album covers satirizing corporate music. Their second collaboration was a series of painted photographs that were exhibited at Civilian Warfare Gallery in 1986.

Her work was included by Tricia Collins and Richard Milazzo in the Collins & Milazzo exhibition Natural Genre: From the Neutral Subject to the Hypothesis of World Objects in 1984 at the Florida State University Gallery and Museum. Also Bauman was a participant in the Pier 34 graffiti project that was documented by Andreas Sterzing in 1983/84. Her art is in public collections, including The Cooper-Hewitt, Museum of American Art, The Musee de Cloitre des Cordeliers, and The Thomas Armann Foundation.

Jack Johnston grouped her ceramics into two categories: cast pieces and hand-formed shapes.

In 2011, Genie Davis praised Bauman’s artworks and regarded her as one of the well-known artists of the time. Eric Minh Swenson has filmed her artworks in the form of a documentary describing Bauman’s different painting styles. In 1993, Bauman attended OC Forum and focused on the discussion of How the Arts Can Help in the AIDS Crisis, which was featured in the Los Angeles Times.”

Selected artworks East Village Art, 1980sBackwards America, 1980Red Phone, 1980Falling Man and Statue of Liberty, 1981Skyline, 1981Big Volcano, 1981Dark House, 1979-1981Not OK, 1983Sighting Mothra, 2011Apophenia, 2016	Remnant/Detritus, 2018FloraBau, 2015-2018Dante's Inferno''

Selected exhibitions
ClampArt Gallery, "Empty Stencils: The Street Art of Jane Bauman, David Wojnarowicz, and Artists From Civilian Warfare Gallery", NYC, 2020
LGBT Advocate & Gochis Galleries, "Let Me Come Home", Los Angeles, CA  2019
Brooklyn Waterfront Artists Coalition, "Painting to Survive: 1985 – 95", NYC, NY  2018
4th Element Gallery, "FloraBau", solo exhibition, Santa Ana, CA 2018
Hunter College Art Gallery, "Something Possible Everywhere, Pier 34", NYC, NY 2016
Brett Rubbico Gallery, "Sighting Mothra", solo exhibition, Newport Beach, CA, 2013
At Space Gallery, "Apophenia", solo exhibition, Santa Ana, CA 2009
Chapman University Guggenheim Gallery, "Beyond Abstraction", Orange, CA  2008
At Space Gallery, "True Hallucinations", solo exhibition, Santa Ana, CA 2007
Turner Carroll Gallery, "Works on Metal", Santa Fe, NM  2004
Terrain Gallery, "Jane Bauman", solo exhibitions, San Francisco, CA  1988 & 1989
Civilian Warfare Gallery, "Jane Bauman – Mark C: Photo/Painting Collab", NYC,NY 1986
Holly Solomen Gallery, "Selected Artists from the East Village", NYC, NY  1985
Anna Freibe Gallery, "Jane Bauman/Huck Snyder", Cologne, Germany 1984
University Art Museum Santa Barbara, “NeoYork", Santa Barbara, CA  1984
Gallery Engstrum, "Twelve Women From New York", Stockholm, Sweden  1984
Civilian Warfare Gallery, "Jane Bauman" solo exhibitions, NYC, NY  1984 & 1985
American Graffiti Gallery, "The Best of the East Village", Amsterdam, Holland  1983
White Columns, "Speed Trials", NYC, NY  1982

External links
Jane Bauman Website

References

Living people
20th-century American women artists
21st-century American women artists
American women painters
American women sculptors
Artists from California
People from Burbank, California
Santa Clara University alumni
San Francisco Art Institute alumni
Year of birth missing (living people)